Ramiro Hernández García (born 19 February 1954) is a Mexican politician affiliated with the PRI. He served as Senator of the LX and LXI Legislatures of the Mexican Congress representing Jalisco. He also served as federal deputy during the 1988–1991 period, as well as a local deputy in the LI, LV and LVII Legislature of the Congress of Jalisco.

References

1954 births
Living people
Politicians from Jalisco
Members of the Senate of the Republic (Mexico)
Members of the Chamber of Deputies (Mexico)
Institutional Revolutionary Party politicians
21st-century Mexican politicians
20th-century Mexican politicians
University of Guadalajara alumni
Chapingo Autonomous University alumni
Members of the Congress of Jalisco